The Vermont Mozart Festival is a series of indoor and outdoor concerts presented annually at sites throughout the state of Vermont. First held in 1974, the festival primarily focuses on the works of Wolfgang Amadeus Mozart. In 2010 the original Vermont Mozart Festival disbanded and dissolved; however, 2015 violinist Michael Dabroski announced a new Vermont Mozart Festival, Inc. and programs with its Title Sponsor NBT Bank, the City of South Burlington, and partnerships with community supporters, including Burlington Country Club, South Burlington Rotary Club, and others. In 2016, Vermont Mozart Festival planned to produce many all-Mozart concert events year-round, including a summer series of outdoor concerts and a three-week summer Fellowship Program for thirty awardees.

History
The Festival was founded in 1974 by Melvin Kaplan, oboist and teacher at Juilliard, in collaboration with conductor William Metcalfe and the University of Vermont. The first season featured all-Mozart performances at the UVM Show Barn, Shelburne Farms, Royall Tyler Theatre, Robert Hull Fleming Museum, St. Paul's Cathedral, and aboard the S.S. Champlain. The Shelburne Farms concert marked the first time that the site was opened for a public event. In all, ten concerts were held over two weeks. The following season, the Festival's format was expanded to include 15 concerts and three workshops. This format remained mostly unchanged for the rest of the Festival for 37 years, though in 2006 the Festival presented 19 concerts. The Festival performed more than 3,000 pieces in over 50 locations, including at least 278 of Mozart's 626 works—possibly more than any other festival or concert series in the United States.

The Festival was incorporated as a non-profit organization in late 1976; the first full board of directors was assembled in early 1977.  Following a successful fundraising campaign, the Festival achieved national recognition when CBS Sunday Morning filmed a week of concerts on location.  A series of winter concerts began in 1978, and by 1979 the Festival was firmly established, drawing praise from the New York Times, Boston Globe, Los Angeles Times, and Montreal Star.  In 1983, the complete Winter Series was recorded by National Public Radio and aired on Performance Today. In 1984, the Festival presented its first concert on the meadow of the Trapp Family Lodge in Stowe, Vermont, which quickly became, along with Shelburne Farms, one of the Festival's two largest and most popular concert sites. In the 2000s, all concerts on the Trapp meadow were followed by fireworks displays.

Traditions
 The Grand Opening Concert of the Summer Festival was preceded by a classical dressage exhibition.
 The Summer Festival concluded with Mozart's Ave verum Corpus.

Financial sustainability

In early 2005, the new executive director announced that the Festival was about $140,000 in debt—enough to put the Festival's continued existence in  jeopardy. Supporters responded; and in two seasons, 65% of that debt was eliminated. The same executive director then resigned citing differences with the Festival's board of directors. Over the following four seasons, the deficit climbed to almost a third of the million dollar annual budget. After 36 years, the Festival closed its doors following the December 2010 winter concert.

Notable performers

Over the years, the Festival featured various performers including both established musicians and up-and-coming talent.

In the media

 “Melvin Kaplan, the oboist who is the Festival’s artistic director, has pieced together a remarkably attractive season that in its resourcefulness, sophistication and occasional downright giddiness puts many of our better-established festivals to shame.” – Henahan, Donal. New York Times (1978)
 “One has all the ingredients necessary for a splendid musical vacation.  For those with… a love of gorgeous sites and sounds, the Vermont Mozart Festival is a definite must.” – Montreal Star (July 1979)
 “The Vermont Mozart Festival brings the music of Mozart to life.” – CBS Sunday Morning (August 1991)
 “Mozart under the lights at Lincoln Center is an enchanting musical experience.  Mozart under the stars at Shelburne Farms… is something else again.  This is a perennial favorite.” – New York Times (1992)
 “On the score of settings, it’s difficult to beat the Vermont Mozart Festival.” – Boston Globe (1993)

See also
Vermont Symphony Orchestra

References

External links
 Official site

Music festivals established in 1974
Classical music festivals in the United States
Music festivals in Vermont
Music festivals disestablished in 2010
Mozart festivals
1974 establishments in Vermont
2010 disestablishments in Vermont